Luiz Felipe Scolari  (born 9 November 1948), also known as Felipão ("Big Phil"), is a Brazilian football manager and former player. 

Scolari was a defender during his playing days, and notably represented Caxias before moving to a managerial role in 1982. After leading the Brazil national team to a FIFA World Cup win in 2002, he was manager of the Portugal national team from July 2003 to June 2008. He led Portugal to the final of UEFA Euro 2004, which they lost 0–1 to Greece, and to a fourth-place finish in the 2006 World Cup. Scolari also managed Portugal through UEFA Euro 2008, but resigned after a 2–3 loss to Germany in the second round.

After a return to club management at Chelsea in the Premier League, Scolari was hired again as manager of the Brazil national team in 2012. He led them to victory at the 2013 Confederations Cup, and to the semi-final in the 2014 World Cup. After the Brazil national team finished fourth overall in an upset 1–7 loss to Germany in the semi-finals, and a 0–3 loss to the Netherlands in the third-place playoff, the Brazilian Football Confederation decided not to renew his contract. In 2015, he started work at Guangzhou Evergrande and went on to claim both the 2015 Chinese Super League and 2015 AFC Champions League in his first season with the club.

Scolari is a dual citizen of Brazil and Italy, as he is descended from Italian immigrants.

Playing career
Scolari was born in Passo Fundo, Rio Grande do Sul. A defender regarded as more uncompromising than skillful, he was known among his contemporaries as "Perna-de-Pau" (literally translated as "wooden leg" in Portuguese, a Brazilian slang for a bad player), Scolari followed in the footsteps of his father, Benjamin Scolari, who was also a professional footballer. His playing career encompassed spells with Caxias, Juventude, Novo Hamburgo, and CSA; he often captained his sides. It was with CSA that he won his only major title as a player – the 1981 Campeonato Alagoano.

Managerial career

Early career
Upon retiring as a player in 1982, he was appointed manager of CSA, his former club, and would go on to win the Alagoas state championship in his first season. After spells with Juventude (twice), Brasil de Pelotas and Pelotas and Saudi Arabian side Al-Shabab, he moved to Grêmio, where he won the 1987 Gaúcho state championship. After managing Goiás, Scolari had a two-year stint in charge of Kuwaiti side Al Qadisiya Kuwait, with whom he won the prestigious Kuwait Emir Cup in 1989. This was followed by a brief period as manager of the Kuwait national team, winning the 10th Gulf Cup in Kuwait. Scolari returned to Brazil to coach Coritiba. He stayed for just three matches, losing all of them. After the last loss, he abandoned the club by boarding the winning team's bus back to his hometown; and did not return even to collect his wages. Scolari coached Criciúma to their first major national title, in the 1991 Copa do Brasil. He returned to club management in the Middle East, managing Al-Ahli and a second spell at Al Qadisiya.

Return to Grêmio
In 1993, Scolari returned to Grêmio, where, albeit leading the team to historic victories, he was criticized by the Brazilian media for playing a pragmatic style of football regarded as "un-Brazilian". He claimed six titles in only three years, including the 1995 Copa Libertadores, which qualified Grêmio for the Intercontinental Cup, which they lost to Dutch side Ajax on penalties. The following year, they won the Brazilian Championship.

His team featured no real superstar and depended on workman-like players such as Paraguayan right back Francisco Arce, tough-tackling midfielder Dinho, Paulo Nunes, and centre forward Mário Jardel.

Júbilo Iwata
In 1997, Scolari became manager of J. League side Júbilo Iwata, but left after eleven games and shortly afterwards took charge of Palmeiras back in Brazil.

Palmeiras
In three years as manager, Scolari led Palmeiras to the Copa do Brasil, the Mercosur Cup, and their first Copa Libertadores title with a win on penalties over Deportivo Cali of Colombia. They were also runners-up to Manchester United in the 1999 Intercontinental Cup. He was named South American Coach of the Year for 1999.

Cruzeiro
In 2000, Scolari was appointed to manage Minas Gerais club Cruzeiro, coaching them for a year.

Brazil
In June 2001, Scolari was appointed manager of his native Brazil, who, with five qualifying matches ahead, were in jeopardy of not qualifying for the 2002 FIFA World Cup, which would be a first in the Brazilian competitive record. Despite losing his first match 1–0 to Uruguay, Scolari eventually guided the team to qualification.

In the build-up to the finals, Scolari refused to include veteran striker Romário in his squad, despite public pressure and a tearful appeal from the player himself. Brazil entered the tournament unfancied, but wins over Turkey, China, Costa Rica, Belgium, England and Turkey again took them to the final, where they beat Germany 2–0 with two goals from Ronaldo to win their fifth FIFA World Cup title.

Portugal

After his World Cup victory, Scolari took over as manager of Portugal in 2003 and oversaw their preparations as host nation for UEFA Euro 2004. In the finals, Portugal got through the group stages and saw off England in the quarter-finals on penalties before beating the Netherlands in the semi-finals. In the final, however, they were beaten in a 1–0 upset by tournament underdogs Greece.

Scolari managed Portugal through the 2006 World Cup in Germany, where they reached the semi-finals, again coming out victorious in the quarterfinals against England. But they did not reach the final due to a semifinal defeat against eventual runners-up France. Following the tournament, Scolari was very heavily slated for the job of England manager, but ultimately opted to continue coaching Portugal.

Scolari took Portugal to Euro 2008, where they reached the knock-out stages by placing first in Group A before being eliminated by Germany in the quarter-finals. During the tournament, he announced that he would be joining English Premier League side Chelsea for the 2008–09 season.

Chelsea

Scolari took over as manager of Chelsea on 1 July 2008. This was announced shortly after Portugal's Euro 2008 match against the Czech Republic on 11 June. With this appointment, Scolari became the first World Cup-winning manager to manage in the Premier League. In previous press conferences, Scolari had talked about "tantrums" and "triumphs" and had a reputation as a tough and unpredictable person. When asked whether his decision to join Chelsea was financial, he responded, "Yes, that is one of the reasons," but also added, "I'm 59 and I don't want to work as a coach until I'm 70. I want to retire in four or five years, so it was a financial matter but there are other things." He also said, "I could offer my son the opportunity to study elsewhere. You only get this kind of opportunity once so you take it or leave it, but it was not only financial." Scolari later said that he had turned down an offer to manage Manchester City.

Scolari's first match in charge of Chelsea was a friendly match against Chinese side Guangzhou Pharmaceutical, a 4–0 victory. He made Barcelona midfielder Deco, a player he was familiar with on the Portugal national team, his first signing for a fee of around £8 million, but was subsequently frustrated in his attempts to sign Brazilian international Robinho from Real Madrid. Under Scolari, Chelsea had the biggest away win of the club in five years in which Chelsea won 5–0 at the Riverside Stadium in October 2008. It was also the club's biggest win ever at Middlesbrough.

Scolari was sacked as Chelsea manager on 9 February 2009 after a run of poor form culminating in a 2–0 defeat at Liverpool followed by frustrating 0–0 home draw with Hull City. The club's stated reason for his removal was that "the results and performances of the team appeared to be deteriorating at a key time in the season". Scolari's replacement at Chelsea for the remainder of the 2008–09 season was Dutch manager Guus Hiddink, who simultaneously managed the Russia national team.

Bunyodkor
On 6 June 2009, Scolari was spotted in attendance at Uzbekistan's World Cup qualifier against Japan; on 8 June 2009, Scolari revealed that he had signed an 18-month contract with the Uzbekistani champions FC Bunyodkor. The contract made Scolari the highest paid football manager in the world, earning €13 million a year.

He left by mutual consent on 29 May 2010 after failing to guide Bunyodkor past the last 16 in the AFC Champions League, although he cited concern regarding his son's education as the key reason.

Return to Palmeiras
On 13 June 2010, Scolari was announced as Palmeiras' new manager. He signed a -year contract. Palmeiras were 2012 Copa do Brasil champions under his management. In September 2012, Scolari left by mutual consent after an unsatisfying result in the Campeonato Brasileiro.

Return to Brazil

In November 2012, after two months without a club, Scolari returned to managing the Brazil national team, replacing the outgoing Mano Menezes. He was tasked with securing a win in the 2014 FIFA World Cup, in which Brazil would be hosts. Scolari had previously won the 2002 FIFA World Cup as manager of Brazil.

Under Scolari, Brazil beat Japan 3–0 in the opening game of the 2013 FIFA Confederations Cup, with goals from Neymar in the third minute, Paulinho in the 48th minute and Jô on the 90th minute. Three days later, his team won 2–0 over Mexico, with Neymar scoring again in the ninth minute.

Brazil defeated Uruguay 2–1 in the semi-final match of the 2013 FIFA Confederations Cup in a tough draw, with goals from Fred in the 41st minute paired with a late goal from Paulinho in the 86th minute. In the final, Brazil defeated Spain 3–0 with two goals from Fred and one from Neymar.

After a successful campaign which earned them a semi-final spot in the 2014 FIFA World Cup, Brazil were defeated 7–1 in an upset loss against Germany at the semi-final stage, which became their biggest-ever defeat at the World Cup (their largest margin of defeat was previously losing 3-0 to France in the 1998 final), the record for most goals conceded in their World Cup track record and its first home loss in a competitive match since 1975. Scolari described the match as "the worst day of [his] life", and took responsibility for the loss.

On 14 July 2014, following a further 3–0 defeat in the third place playoff match against the Netherlands, Scolari resigned from his position as Brazilian manager.

Third return to Grêmio
On 29 July 2014, Scolari signed with Grêmio. He was officially unveiled by the club the following day at the Arena do Grêmio. On 19 May 2015, Scolari resigned from his position after a poor start to the season.

Guangzhou Evergrande
On 4 June 2015, Scolari was appointed head coach of Chinese Super League champions Guangzhou Evergrande, signing a one-and-a-half plus one-year contract. After four months in charge, Scolari led the club to victory in the 2015 Chinese Super League and AFC Champions League, defeating Cosmin Olăroiu's Al-Ahli side with a 1–0 aggregate win in the final. He extended his contract for one year on 24 October 2016 after his potential successor Marcello Lippi was appointed as the manager of China national team. Scolari led Guangzhou win three consecutive league titles from 2015 to 2017. He refused to extend his contract again by the end of 2017 season.

Third return to Palmeiras

On 27 July 2018, Scolari returned to Brazilian side Palmeiras for a third time. On 2 September 2019, Scolari would be fired by club, that is under a poor performance after 2019 Copa America; in this period, Scolari gained only 23.8% of points played by Palmeiras.

Return to Cruzeiro
On 15 October 2020, Scolari returned to manage the football team of Cruzeiro. On 25 January 2021, Scolari and Cruzeiro parted ways by mutual agreement.

Fourth return to Grêmio
On 7 July 2021, Scolari returned to Grêmio for the fourth time, with the goal of moving the team out of the last place in the Brasileiro Série A and fighting for the Copa Sudamericana. He left on a mutual agreement on 11 October, with the club second bottom of the league.

Athletico Paranaense
On 4 May 2022, Scolari was hired by Athletico Paranaense as a technical director, being also a manager of the first team "until new definitions".

Personal life
Scolari also holds Italian citizenship, since his family emigrated from Veneto. He is a fan of Grêmio, and was reported to be a fan of Nottingham Forest, having watched their successes under Brian Clough in the 1970s. Scolari is a Roman Catholic.

During his career, the media has been fond of pointing out Scolari's facial resemblance to actor Gene Hackman and Marlon Brando's portrayal of Don Vito Corleone in the film The Godfather. In Brazil, Scolari is also known as "Felipão", and during his stint with Chelsea, he was sometimes referred by the English translation, Big Phil.

Managerial statistics

Honours as manager

Club
Al Qadisiya
Kuwait Emir Cup: 1989

Criciúma
Copa do Brasil: 1991

Grêmio
Campeonato Brasileiro Série A: 1996
Copa do Brasil: 1994
Copa Libertadores: 1995
Recopa Sudamericana: 1996

Palmeiras
Campeonato Brasileiro Série A: 2018
Copa do Brasil: 1998, 2012
Copa Mercosur: 1998
Copa Libertadores: 1999
Torneio Rio-São Paulo: 2000

Cruzeiro
Copa Sul-Minas: 2001

Bunyodkor
Uzbek League: 2009

Guangzhou Evergrande
Chinese Super League: 2015, 2016, 2017
AFC Champions League: 2015
Chinese FA Cup: 2016
Chinese FA Super Cup: 2016, 2017

International
Kuwait
Arabian Gulf Cup: 1990

Brazil
FIFA World Cup: 2002
FIFA Confederations Cup: 2013

Portugal
UEFA European Championship runner-up: 2004

Individual
 Brasileirão Coach of the Year: 2018
South American Coach of the Year: 1999, 2002
IFFHS World's Best National Coach: 2002
Chinese Football Association Coach of the Year: 2015, 2016

Orders
 Commander of the Order of Prince Henry
 Medal of Merit, Order of the Immaculate Conception of Vila Viçosa (House of Braganza)

See also
 List of Brazil national football team managers

References

External links

 
 

1948 births
Living people
Brazilian people of Italian descent
People from Passo Fundo
Brazilian Roman Catholics
Brazilian footballers
Association football defenders
Clube Esportivo Aimoré players
Sociedade Esportiva e Recreativa Caxias do Sul players
Esporte Clube Juventude players
Esporte Clube Novo Hamburgo players
Centro Sportivo Alagoano players
Campeonato Brasileiro Série B players
Brazilian football managers
Centro Sportivo Alagoano managers
Esporte Clube Juventude managers
Al Shabab FC (Riyadh) managers
Grêmio Esportivo Brasil managers
Esporte Clube Pelotas managers
Grêmio Foot-Ball Porto Alegrense managers
Goiás Esporte Clube managers
Qadsia SC managers
Kuwait national football team managers
Coritiba Foot Ball Club managers
Criciúma Esporte Clube managers
Al-Ahli Saudi FC managers
J1 League managers
Júbilo Iwata managers
Sociedade Esportiva Palmeiras managers
Cruzeiro Esporte Clube managers
Club Athletico Paranaense managers
Brazil national football team managers
Portugal national football team managers
Chelsea F.C. managers
FC Bunyodkor managers
Guangzhou F.C. managers
Campeonato Brasileiro Série A managers
Campeonato Brasileiro Série B managers
Saudi Professional League managers
Kuwait Premier League managers
Premier League managers
Uzbekistan Super League managers
Chinese Super League managers
2001 Copa América managers
2002 FIFA World Cup managers
UEFA Euro 2004 managers
2006 FIFA World Cup managers
UEFA Euro 2008 managers
2013 FIFA Confederations Cup managers
2014 FIFA World Cup managers
FIFA World Cup-winning managers
FIFA Confederations Cup-winning managers
Brazilian expatriate football managers
Brazilian expatriate sportspeople in Saudi Arabia
Brazilian expatriate sportspeople in Kuwait
Brazilian expatriate sportspeople in Japan
Brazilian expatriate sportspeople in Portugal
Brazilian expatriate sportspeople in England
Brazilian expatriate sportspeople in Uzbekistan
Brazilian expatriate sportspeople in China
Expatriate football managers in Saudi Arabia
Expatriate football managers in Kuwait
Expatriate football managers in Japan
Expatriate football managers in Portugal
Expatriate football managers in England
Expatriate football managers in Uzbekistan
Expatriate football managers in China
Sportspeople from Rio Grande do Sul